The Special Forces Command, previously known as the 911th Special Forces Regiment until July 2020, is the special forces unit of the Royal Cambodian Army. Most of its commandos have graduated from training under Kopassus instructors. In order to graduate from the school, all cadets have to pass the test set. On passing, cadets receive their own red beret and a wings badge.

The Special Forces Command has multiple units, including snipers, naval units, and an anti-terrorist division.

Organization and structure 

The Operation Base of the Special Forces Command is near Takethmey Village, Kambol Commune, Angsnoul District, Kandal Province. This unit is under direct command of the High Command Headquarters of Royal Cambodian Armed Forces. The Special Forces Command has seven branches with 14 battalions under their control.

Following units is distributed in the Battalions:
 Commando 1 to Commando 4 (Airborne Commando)
 Commando 5 to Commando 9 (Attack Commando)
 Commando 10 to Commando 12 (Support Commando)
 Special Group 13 (Close Protection)
 Counter-terrorist Group 14
Total staff 5,000

Counter terrorist 14 Group is Cambodian first specialized anti terrorist unit, and is the command SWAT component. Counter terrorist 14 Group support law enforcement in anti terrorist operations

The SF regularly conduct trainings and joint exercises such as:
 Special forces 6 course (commando Red Barret)
 Airborne 11 Course (para)
 Freefall 3 Course
 Scuba 3 Course (Chhak Sea)
 Terrorist Counter 3 Course (T.O)
 Training has also been conducted in Indonesia under a special program at Batujajar. Batujajar special forces training center is located 22 kilometers from Bandung (West Java), where SF soldiers have been trained in parachute jumping and Landing zone tactics.

Equipment
The special forces' equipment varies from that of the rest of the army.  For example, the AK-47 (Type 56) rifle, although reliable and abundant, is not accurate, and is too powerful for safe use by elite units specializing in close quarters combat and hostage situations.

The forces are the first confirmed foreign user of the QBZ-97.

References

Special forces units and formations
Special forces of Cambodia
Military units and formations established in 1953